Sheikh Basharat "Basher" Hassan (born March 24, 1944) was a Kenyan first-class cricketer who played for Nottinghamshire County Cricket Club from 1966 to 1985. A right-handed batsman, he made 14,394 runs at an average of 29.07.

After playing club cricket in Kenya, Hassan made his first-class debut for an East African Invitation XI against the Marylebone Cricket Club in 1963. He moved to England and made his debut for Nottinghamshire in 1966 against Oxford University whilst serving the then mandatory period of qualification. Having made 579 runs in 1967 he was forced to sit out the 1968 season when Gary Sobers was engaged. Initially a wicketkeeper, he developed as an opening batsman although he occasionally kept wicket in List A cricket. He was a notable fieldsman; in 1971 Wisden said that "his brilliance in the covers stamped him as one of the outstanding men in this position in the country" and that his team-mates were "fired by the example of the enthusiastic Hassan".

He became a regular member of the Nottinghamshire first team in 1969 and scored 1,000 runs in a season on five occasions and scored fifteen centuries. His highest score was 182 not out against Gloucestershire in 1977. In List A matches his highest was 120 not out against Warwickshire in 1981.

He was 12th man for England in a Test in 1985 at Trent Bridge during the Ashes series after which he retired from county cricket. He was for some years the Nottinghamshire Development Manager.

References

External links

Further reading
 Basharat Hassan, Basher: The Autobiography of Basharat Hassan (2004)

East African cricketers
Nottinghamshire cricketers
Cricketers from Nairobi
Kenyan Muslims
Kenyan people of Indian descent
Kenyan cricketers
Kenyan cricket umpires
International Cavaliers cricketers
1944 births
Living people
Coast Cricket Association XI cricketers
T. N. Pearce's XI cricketers
Wicket-keepers